State Highway 136 (SH 136) is a  state highway in southern Colorado. It runs from an intersection with U.S. Highway 285 (US 285) in La Jara southeast to the community of Sanford.

Route description
SH 136 begins in the west at US 285 and Main Street in La Jara and proceeds east to Sanford where the route turns abruptly south shortly before reaching its eastern end at an intersection with Ivy Street in Sanford. The roadway continues southward after the route's terminus, as Main Street.

History 
The route was established in the 1920s, when it began at U.S. Highway 285 and ended at SH 159, using a concurrency with SH 142 near San Acacio. The route was paved to its current terminus by 1939, and the rest of the road was deleted in 1954, leaving what it is today.

Major intersections

References

External links

136
Transportation in Conejos County, Colorado